The men's 35 kilometres walk at the 2022 World Athletics Championships was held at the Hayward Field in Eugene on 24 July 2022.

Records
Before the competition records were as follows:

Qualification standard
The standard to qualify automatically for entry was 2:33:00 or 3:50:00 over 50 kilometres.

Schedule
The event schedule, in local time (UTC−7), was as follows:

Results 
The event was started at 06:15.

References

35 km walk
Racewalking at the World Athletics Championships